Jennifer Lopez: Halftime is a 2022 American Netflix original documentary film directed by Amanda Micheli. Its story follows the career of Jennifer Lopez, with a heavy focus on her performance at the Super Bowl LIV halftime show and her film Hustlers (2019). The film premiered at the opening night of the 2022 Tribeca Film Festival, and was released on Netflix on June 14, 2022.

Lopez re-recorded an orchestra version of the song entitled "Same Girl (Halftime Remix)" featuring French Montana along with another song, a rendition of "This Land Is Your Land" / "America the Beautiful", to coincide with the release of the film.

Cast
 Jennifer Lopez
 Shakira
 Ben Affleck
 Adam Blackstone
 Hamish Hamilton
 Lorene Scafaria
 Jimmy Fallon 
 Julia Stiles
 Constance Wu
 Lili Reinhart 
 Keke Palmer 
 Christy Lemire

Release
The film premiered as the opening night film at the Tribeca Film Festival on June 8, 2022, and on Netflix on June 14, 2022.

The film debuted at #2 worldwide on Netflix on its second day of streaming, behind Hustle starring Adam Sandler.

Between June 12, 2022 and June 26, 2022 the documentary was watched for 27.25 million hours on Netflix.

Reception
Overall, the documentary has garnered positive reviews from film critics and the general public alike. The film has a 84% approval rating on Rotten Tomatoes based on 37 reviews. Richard Roeper of the Chicago Sun Times gave the film 3 out of 4 stars, calling it "a solid, entertaining, insider's look at the life and times of a once-aspiring singer-dancer-actress from the Bronx who left home at 18 to pursue her dreams, got her first big break as a 'Fly Girl' on In Living Color, and for the last three decades has starred in some 40 major motion pictures and has sold more than 75 million records worldwide." Adam Green of The Detroit News called it "an inspirational look at someone who has overcome the odds and continues to fight to be taken seriously and to have her voice be heard." Peter Sobczynski of RogerEbert.com gave the film 2 out of 4 stars and concluded that it "is unlikely to majorly shift anyone's thoughts on Jennifer Lopez."

Accolades

References

External links
 
 

2022 films
2022 documentary films
Netflix original documentary films
Films set in 2019
Films set in 2020
Films set in 2021
Documentary films about singers
Super Bowl halftime shows
Jennifer Lopez
American documentary films
2020s English-language films
Films directed by Amanda Micheli
Films scored by Antônio Pinto
2020s American films